Dizzy Detectives is a 1943 short subject directed by Jules White starring American slapstick comedy team The Three Stooges (Moe Howard, Larry Fine and Curly Howard). It is the 68th entry in the series released by Columbia Pictures starring the comedians, who released 190 shorts for the studio between 1934 and 1959.

Plot
After an attempt at installing a door with mishaps galore, the boys are recruited by the police commissioner (Bud Jamison) as police officers. The head of the citizen's league, Mr. Dill (John Tyrrell), warns the police commissioner that he must capture the "Ape Man", a criminal wearing a gorilla suit, that is terrorizing the city, or he will have his job.

The boys get a tip that the Ape Man is burglarizing a particular store and head out to catch him. They patrol the antique store, with Curly pausing for a while in a rocking chair aside a cat whose tail happens to swing simultaneously with the rocker. The tail gets caught eventually, causing the cat to screech and Curly to scurry away in terror, swallowing his cigar in the process.

While there, they encounter the Ape Man, Bonzo (Ray "Crash" Corrigan), who proves to be a real gorilla after he bends the barrels of the guns the Stooges intended to use against him. The trio then discover several thugs that are behind the gorilla's rampage, including Mr. Dill, who is conspiring to remove the chief so he can be the successor. The gorilla was taken from a circus and not used to this job. The Stooges proceed to beat up the thugs with all manner of fights. After encountering a fake guillotine set, which shocks Larry and Moe, Curly disposes of the gorilla by head butting him. But beforehand, the gorilla drinks a bottle of nitroglycerin the thugs were carrying, causing Bonzo to explode when Curly charges him.

Cast

Credited

Production notes
Dizzy Detectives was filmed over four days on June 29-July 2, 1942. The opening carpentry scene is lifted from 1935's Pardon My Scotch, including footage of Moe crashing to the floor and breaking three ribs.

This is the second of three Stooge shorts with the word "dizzy" in the title.

Dizzy Detectives was remade — line-by-line — with future third Stooge Joe Besser and Jim Hawthorne as 'Fraidy Cat in 1951; Fraidy Cat was itself remade in 1955 as Hook a Crook, using stock footage. Jules White directed all three films.

References

External links
 
 
Dizzy Detectives at threestooges.net

1943 films
The Three Stooges films
American black-and-white films
Films directed by Jules White
1943 comedy films
Columbia Pictures short films
American slapstick comedy films
1940s English-language films
1940s American films